Fernando Zóbel may refer to:
 Fernando Zobel de Ayala, president of Ayala Corporation
 Fernando Zóbel de Ayala y Montojo, artist